The Houston Open 2016 is the men's edition of the 2016 Houston Open, which is a tournament of the PSA World Tour event International (Prize money: $50,000). The event took place in Houston in the United States from 12 September to 15 May. Marwan El Shorbagy won his first Houston Open trophy, beating Mohamed Abouelghar in the final.

Prize money and ranking points
For 2016, the prize purse was $50,000. The prize money and points breakdown was as follows:

Seeds

Draw and results

See also
2016 PSA World Tour
Houston Open (squash)

References

External links
PSA The Houston Open 2016 website
The Houston Open 2016 squashsite page

Squash tournaments in the United States
2016 in squash
2016 in American sports
Squash in Texas